Jesse Jyrkkiö (born June 29, 1989) is a Finnish professional ice hockey defenceman. He is currently a free agent having last played for GKS Katowice in the Polska Hokej Liga. He has previously played in the Finnish Liiga with  Ässät and Tappara. Prior to the 2014–15 season, Jyrkkiö signed his first contract abroad in agreeing to a try-out contract with Austrian club, Graz 99ers in the Austrian Hockey League (EBEL) on September 10, 2014.

His father, Juha Jyrkkiö, played for FoPS, Jokerit, Ässät and HPK.

References

External links

1989 births
Living people
HK Acroni Jesenice players
Fehérvár AV19 players
Asplöven HC players
Ässät players
Frederikshavn White Hawks players
Gentofte Stars players
GKS Katowice (ice hockey) players
Graz 99ers players
KooKoo players
Lempäälän Kisa players
Scorpions de Mulhouse players
Tappara players
TuTo players
Finnish ice hockey defencemen
People from Hämeenlinna
Sportspeople from Kanta-Häme